Antirrhea ornata is a butterfly of the family Nymphalidae. It was described by Arthur Gardiner Butler in 1870. It is found in French Guiana.

References

 Antirrhea ornata at Insecta.pro

Butterflies described in 1870
Morphinae
Taxa named by Arthur Gardiner Butler
Nymphalidae of South America